The Raab Krähe is a West German high-wing, single-seat, pusher configuration motor glider that was designed by Fritz Raab for amateur construction around 1958.

Design and development
Raab designed the Krähe specifically for homebuilders.

The Krähe is constructed from wood, with the fuselage made from a wooden structure covered in doped aircraft fabric. The  span wings are built with a wooden structure and covered in plywood and fabric. The wings feature spoilers and a custom Raab-designed airfoil. The tailplane is braced with four cables to the wing trailing edge. The landing gear is a fixed monowheel.

The motor installation is unconventional for a motorglider in that the engine is mounted in the rear of the cabin area, with the propeller in between the top and bottom tail boom tubes.

About 30 examples were reported completed by 1974.

Operational history
The aircraft is no longer on the US Federal Aviation Administration registry.

Variants
Krähe
Initial model with monowheel landing gear and propeller in between top and bottom tail boom tubes.
Austria Krähe
Later model with tricycle landing gear and propeller rotating around the upper tail boom tube.

Specifications (Krähe)

See also

References

1950s German sailplanes
Homebuilt aircraft
Glider aircraft
Aircraft first flown in 1958
Krähe
Motor gliders
Single-engined pusher aircraft